Miroslav Holec (born November 8, 1987) is a Czech professional ice hockey forward who currently plays for Motor České Budějovice of the Czech Extraliga.

Holec has previously played for HC Slavia Praha, HC Kometa Brno, HC Plzeň and HC Olomouc.

References

 
 

1987 births
Living people
HC Kometa Brno players
AZ Havířov players
BK Havlíčkův Brod players
HC Olomouc players
IHC Písek players
HC Plzeň players
HC Slavia Praha players
SK Horácká Slavia Třebíč players
Sportspeople from Písek
Czech ice hockey forwards
Motor České Budějovice players